Bychok is a rural locality (a selo) and the administrative center of Bychkovskoye Rural Settlement, Petropavlovsky District, Voronezh Oblast, Russia. The population was 972 as of 2010. There are 25 streets.

Geography 
Bychok is located 12 km southwest of Petropavlovka (the district's administrative centre) by road. Zamostye is the nearest rural locality.

References 

Rural localities in Petropavlovsky District, Voronezh Oblast